Fumarate reductase is the enzyme that converts fumarate to succinate, and is important in microbial metabolism as a part of anaerobic respiration.

Succinate + acceptor <=> fumarate + reduced acceptor

Fumarate reductases can be divided into two classes depending on the electron acceptor:
Fumarate reductase (quinol)
The membrane-bound enzyme covalently linked to flavin cofactors, which is composed of 3 or 4 subunits, transfers electrons from a quinol to fumarate. This class of enzyme is thus involved in the production of ATP by oxidative phosphorylation.
Fumarate reductase (NADH)
The enzyme is monomeric and soluble, and can reduce fumarate independently from the electron transport chain.  Fumarate reductase is absent from all mammalian cells.

References

External links
 

Enzymes